The Miankuh District of Ardal County is a district (bakhsh) in Ardal County, Chaharmahal and Bakhtiari Province, Iran.

References 

Ardal County
Districts of Chaharmahal and Bakhtiari Province